Ultra.2011 is a dance compilation album from Ultra Records, compiling original and remixed tracks from the label. It was released on November 9, 2010.  Compared to Ultra.2010, the majority of this compilation consists of extended versions of the normal songs.

Track listing 
Disc One:
"We No Speak Americano" - Yolanda Be Cool vs. DCUP
"Stereo Love" - Edward Maya and Vika Jigulina
"Alejandro (Dave Audé Remix)" - Lady Gaga
"Tik Tok" - Ke$ha
"One [Your Name] (Vocal Mix)" - Swedish House Mafia ft. Pharrell
"Fire In Your New Shoes (Extended)" - Kaskade ft. Dragonette
"Ghosts 'n' Stuff" - deadmau5 ft. Rob Swire
"Take Over Control (Extended)" - Afrojack ft. Eva Simons
"Flashback (David Guetta's One Love Remix)" - Calvin Harris
"I'm In Love (Vocal Club Mix)" - Alex Gaudino
"My Girl (Disco Fries Remix)" - Honorebel ft. Sean Kingston, and Trina
"2Gether (Extended)" - Roger Sanchez ft. Far East Movement

Disc Two:
"Spaceship (Extended)" - Benny Benassi ft. Kelis, apl.de.ap, & Jean Baptiste
"Drunk Girls In The Club" - Jump Smokers
"It's My Birthday" - Ultimate
"Give Me A Sign"- Remady ft. Manu-L
"Escape Me (Extended)" - Tiësto ft. C. C. Sheffield
"Animal Rights" - Wolfgang Gartner & deadmau5
"Nothing But Love (Remode Version)" - Axwell ft. Errol Reid
"Saturday (Extended Mix)" - Basshunter
"Closer (Bimbo Jones Remix)" - Jes Brieden
"Not Giving Up On Love (Extended Version)" - Armin van Buuren vs. Sophie Ellis-Bextor
"Just One Day (Extended)" - Kim Sozzi
"Amazing" - Inna

References

External links
Album Site at Ultra Records

2010 compilation albums
Dance music compilation albums
Ultra Records albums